Ojarud-e Gharbi Rural District is in the Central District of Germi County, Ardabil province, Iran. At the census of 2006, its population was 7,849 in 1,669 households; there were 7,775 inhabitants in 1,983 households at the following census of 2011; and in the most recent census of 2016, the population of the rural district was 6,523 in 1,999 households. The largest of its 38 villages was Shahrak-e Vali Asr, with 1,591 people.

References 

Germi County

Rural Districts of Ardabil Province

Populated places in Ardabil Province

Populated places in Germi County